Tupitsyno is a rural locality (a village) in Arkhangelskoye Rural Settlement, Sokolsky District, Vologda Oblast, Russia. The population was 11 as of 2002.

Geography 
Tupitsyno is located 15 km northwest of Sokol (the district's administrative centre) by road. Arkhangelskoye is the nearest rural locality.

References 

Rural localities in Sokolsky District, Vologda Oblast